Irina Viktorovna Khazova, born Irina Artemova (born March 20, 1984 in Sarov) is a Russian cross-country skier who competed from 2003 to 2007. She was then suspended for two year for the use of illegal drugs (doping). She then resumed her career for the 2009–10 Olympic season in very good shape. Khazova won a bronze in the women's team sprint event at the 2010 Winter Olympics in Vancouver.

Her best World Cup finish so far is a second place, which she earned in a 10 km classic competition at Ruka, Kuusamo, Finland on November 29, 2009.

Khazova competed for Russia at the 2007 World Championships in Sapporo, finishing 24th in the 7.5 km + 7.5 km double pursuit.

Doping sanction 
Khazova tested positive for the diuretic Furosemide in 2007 and received a two-year sanction from sports.

Cross-country skiing results
All results are sourced from the International Ski Federation (FIS).

Olympic Games
 1 medal – (1 bronze)

World Championships

World Cup

Season standings

Individual podiums
1 victory 
3 podiums

Team podiums

 1 podium

References

External links
 
 
 
 

1984 births
Living people
People from Sarov
Cross-country skiers at the 2010 Winter Olympics
Cross-country skiers at the 2014 Winter Olympics
Doping cases in cross-country skiing
Russian female cross-country skiers
Tour de Ski skiers
Russian sportspeople in doping cases
Olympic cross-country skiers of Russia
Olympic bronze medalists for Russia
Olympic medalists in cross-country skiing
Medalists at the 2010 Winter Olympics
Sportspeople from Nizhny Novgorod Oblast